Flabellum is a genus of marine corals belonging to the family Flabellidae. These are a diverse group of azooxanthellate corals with about 190 species, 47 of which are extant. They are exclusively solitary corals and many are deep water species.

Description
Corals in this genus are solitary, erect and flattened, with a short, thick peduncle and a long elliptical, slightly curved calyx. The costae are indistinct, simple and flat. The septa are in five complete cycles and are narrow, closely packed, slightly sinuous, and covered with projecting granules.

Fossil record
Fossils of Flabellum are found in marine strata from the Cretaceous until the Quaternary (age range: from 66.043 to 0.012 million years ago.).  Fossils are known from various localities in Europe, North America and Australia.

Species 
The following species are considered to belong to the genus Flabellum: 

Subgenus Flabellum (Flabellum) Lesson, 1831
  Flabellum angustum Yabe & Eguchi, 1942
  Flabellum arcuatile Cairns, 1999
  Flabellum areum Cairns, 1982
  Flabellum atlanticum Cairns, 1979
  Flabellum australe Moseley, 1881
  Flabellum campanulatum Holdsworth, 1862
  Flabellum chunii Marenzeller, 1904
  Flabellum cinctutum Cairns & Polonio, 2013
  Flabellum curvatum Moseley, 1881
  Flabellum flexuosum Cairns, 1982
  Flabellum floridanum Cairns, 1991
  Flabellum folkesoni Cairns, 1998
  Flabellum gardineri Cairns, 1982
  Flabellum impensum Squires, 1962
  Flabellum knoxi Ralph & Squires, 1962
  Flabellum lamellulosum Alcock, 1902
  Flabellum magnificum Marenzeller, 1904
  Flabellum ongulense Eguchi, 1965
  Flabellum patens Moseley, 1881
  Flabellum pavoninum Lesson, 1831
  Flabellum politum Cairns, 1989
  Flabellum thouarsii Milne Edwards & Haime, 1848
  Flabellum transversale Moseley, 1881
  Flabellum vaughani Cairns, 1984

Subgenus Flabellum (Ulocyathus) M. Sars, 1851
  Flabellum alabastrum Moseley in Thomson, 1873
  Flabellum angulare Moseley, 1876
  Flabellum aotearoa Squires, 1964
  Flabellum apertum Moseley, 1876
  Flabellum conuis Moseley, 1881
  Flabellum daphnense Durham & Barnard, 1952
  Flabellum deludens Marenzeller, 1904
  Flabellum hoffmeisteri Cairns & Parker, 1992
  Flabellum japonicum Moseley, 1881
  Flabellum lowekeyesi Squires & Ralph, 1965
  Flabellum macandrewi Gray, 1849
  Flabellum marcus Keller, 1974
  Flabellum marenzelleri Cairns, 1989
  Flabellum messum Alcock, 1902
  Flabellum moseleyi Pourtalès, 1880
  Flabellum sexcostatum Cairns, 1989
  Flabellum tuthilli Hoffmeister, 1933

References

Scleractinia genera
Flabellidae
Taxa named by René Lesson